Andrew Thomas Earl (born 12 September 1961) is a New Zealand rugby union player who played as a forward. Born in Christchurch, he played 45 times for the All Blacks.

Andy Earl played his club rugby for the Glenmark Rugby Club, in North Canterbury. He played his club rugby alongside fellow club members, Robbie Deans, Richard Loe, and Bruce Deans, with other notable club members such as Alex Wyllie also playing for Glenmark.

Since retiring from rugby, Andy Earl owns a sheep farm near the town of Scargill.

References

External links

1961 births
Living people
New Zealand international rugby union players
New Zealand rugby union players
Rugby union flankers
Rugby union players from Christchurch